Richard Burton (1925–1984) was a Welsh actor.

Richard or Dick Burton may also refer to:

Sports
Richard Burton (footballer) (1889–1939), English footballer
Dick Burton (baseball) (1907–?), American baseball player
Dick Burton (golfer) (1907–1974), English golfer
Richard Burton (cricketer, born 1955), English cricketer
Richard Burton (cricketer, born 1976), English cricketer

Others
Nathaniel Crouch (a.k.a. "Richard Burton", born 1632), English printer, bookseller, and history writer
Sir Richard Francis Burton (1821–1890), English explorer, author, translator and orientalist
Richard Henry Burton (1923–1993), English soldier and recipient of the Victoria Cross
Richard M. Burton (born 1939), American organizational theorist
Ted Bundy (a.k.a. "Richard Burton", 1946–1989), American serial killer
Richard Burton (journalist), British journalist
Richard Burton (Baltimore), American hip-hop artist and television actor
Richard Burton (comics), British comic writer and editor

See also
 Richard Bruton (born 1953), Irish government minister